Mexichromis is a genus of colourful sea slugs, dorid nudibranchs, shell-less marine gastropod mollusks in the family Chromodorididae. Current synonymy follows a revision of Chromodorididae which used molecular phylogeny.

Distribution
The genus Mexichromis is represented in the Eastern Pacific by five species, Mexichromis antonii, Mexichromis amalguae, Mexichromis porterae, Mexichromis tica and Mexichromis tura. In the central Indo-Pacific region there are three groups of species, Mexichromis festiva, Mexichromis katalexis, Mexichromis macropus, Mexichromis mariei and Mexichromis multituberculata, all with compact bodies and large dorsal tubercles, Mexichromis aurora and Mexichromis trilineata which were formerly placed in the genus Pectenodoris because of their radula morphology, plus Mexichromis lemniscata, Mexichromis pusilla, Mexichromis albofimbria, Mexichromis circumflava and Mexichromis similaris with long, narrow bodies, which were formerly placed in the genus Durvilledoris.

Species 
Species in the genus Mexichromis include:
{{Linked species list
|Mexichromis albofimbria|Rudman, 1995 
|Mexichromis antonii| (Bertsch, 1976)
|Mexichromis aurora| (R.F. Johnson & Gosliner, 1998)
|Mexichromis circumflava|Rudman, 1990 
|Mexichromis festiva| (Angas, 1864)
|Mexichromis katalexis| Yonow, 2001<ref>Yonow (2001). [[Zoologische Mededelingen| (Leiden) 75(1-15): 3-50.</ref>
|Mexichromis lemniscata| (Quoy & Gaimard, 1832) 
|Mexichromis macropus| Rudman, 1983
|Mexichromis mariei| (Crosse, 1872)
|Mexichromis multituberculata| (Baba, 1953)
|Mexichromis pusilla| (Bergh, 1874)
|Mexichromis similaris| (Rudman, 1986) 
|Mexichromis tica| Gosliner, Ortea & Valdés, 2004
|Mexichromis trilineata| (A. Adams & Reeve, 1850) 
|Mexichromis tura| (Marcus & Marcus, 1967)
}}

Species brought into synonymy 
 Mexichromis amalguae Gosliner & Bertsch, 1988: synonym of Felimare amalguae (Gosliner & Bertsch, 1988)
 Mexichromis francoisae (Bouchet in Bouchet & Ortea, 1980): synonym of Felimare francoisae (Bouchet, 1980)
 Mexichromis kempfi (Ev. Marcus, 1971): synonym of Felimare kempfi (Ev. Marcus, 1971)
 Mexichromis molloi Ortea & Valdés in Ortea, Valdés & Garcia Gómez, 1996: synonym of Felimare molloi (Ortea & Valdés, 1996)
 Mexichromis nyalya (Marcus & Marcus, 1967): synonym of Risbecia nyalya (Ev. Marcus & Er. Marcus, 1967)
 Mexichromis porterae (Cockerell, 1902): synonym of Felimare porterae (Cockerell, 1901)
 Mexichromis tricolor (Cantraine, 1835) : synonym of Hypselodoris tricolor'' (Cantraine, 1835)

References

 

Chromodorididae